Palmira is a municipality and town in the Cienfuegos Province of Cuba. The town proper has a population of circa 14,000, the whole municipality 33,153.

History
It was founded in 1879 under the name Las Casas. The name was changed to Palmira and the community was incorporated in 1940.

Geography

Located in the middle of its province, Palmira is 12 km far from Cienfuegos, 16 from Cruces, and 52 from Santa Clara. It is bordered by the municipalities of Rodas, Lajas, Cruces, Cumanayagua and Cienfuegos.

In 1943 the municipality was divided into the barrios of Primero, Segundo, Arango y Escarza. After the national municipal reform of 1976, it counts 6 consejos populares: Palmira Sur and Palmira Norte for the town, and the villages of Arriete-Ciego Montero, Espartaco, Elpidio Gómez and San Fernando de Camarones.

The thermal water resort of Arriete-Ciego Montero,  form the town of Palmira, is also famous for the bottled water plant named "Ciego Montero".

Demographics
In 2004, the municipality of Palmira had a population of 33,153.

See also
Municipalities of Cuba
List of cities in Cuba

References

External links

Populated places in Cienfuegos Province